The Witu Forest, is a protected area in Lamu District, Kenya, East Africa. It was formed in 1927 by combining the Utwani Forest Reserve with the adjacent Gongoni Forest Reserve, although the previous names remained in use. The independent Kenyan government confirmed the reservation, gazetting the forest in 1962, with  more gazetted in 2002. , there was no management plan for the forest, although it is to be managed under the Forests Act, 2005, by the Kenya Forest Service (KFS) which replaced the prior Forest Department in 2005.

Geography
The Witu Forest is bounded to the northeast, and east, by the Pangani Swamp and to the east and southeast by the Nairobi Ranch, including the Mungajini Forest.  To the south and southwest it is bordered by Witu settlement areas. The settlement areas were established in 1995 for agricultural development for the local people.

Issues
In 2004 illegal logging in Witu forest was reported as being extensive, and a much more serious problem than local hunting for bushmeat. Illegal logging continued and was noted still in 2011.

Notes

References
 
 

Protected areas of Kenya